Shumy is a settlement in the administrative area of the city council of Toretsk in Donetsk Oblast of eastern Ukraine, at 57.4 km NNW from the centre of Donetsk city. It is considered a suburbs of Horlivka.

The War in Donbass, that started in mid-April 2014, has brought along both civilian and military casualties. Initially Shumy was under the control of the separatist Donetsk People's Republic, but in the summer of 2018 the Ukrainian army took control of the village. Control of Shumy is considered a military strategic advantage. The village is located on the frontline near separatist held Horlivka.

Demographics
Native language as of the Ukrainian Census of 2001:
 Russian 84.21%
 Ukrainian 15.79%

References

Villages in Bakhmut Raion